Curculio victoriensis is a species of true weevil in the beetle family Curculionidae. It is found in North America.

Subspecies
These two subspecies belong to the species Curculio victoriensis:
 Curculio victoriensis fulvus Chittenden
 Curculio victoriensis victoriensis

References

Further reading

 
 

Curculioninae
Articles created by Qbugbot
Beetles described in 1904